Takilberan is a rural locality in the Bundaberg Region, Queensland, Australia.

References

Further reading 

 

Bundaberg Region
Localities in Queensland